Oberman may refer to:

Claire Oberman (born 1956), Dutch-born New Zealand actress
Gustavo Oberman (born 1985), Argentine football player
Heiko Oberman (1930–2001), Dutch historian and theologian
Martin J. Oberman, American government employee
Miller Wolf Oberman, American poet
Sheldon Oberman (1949–2004), Canadian children's writer
Tracy-Ann Oberman (born 1969), English actress